Abdel Jebahi (born 21 August 1975) is a French boxer. He competed in the men's lightweight event at the 2000 Summer Olympics.

References

1975 births
Living people
French male boxers
Olympic boxers of France
Boxers at the 2000 Summer Olympics
Sportspeople from Val-d'Oise
Lightweight boxers